Exchange is an unincorporated community and ghost town in Braxton County, West Virginia, United States that has the ZIP code of 26619.  The town was a stopping point on the former Coal and Coke Railway.

As of 2019, the outlying areas surrounding Exchange are still populated, but the main street through town is blocked and most of the buildings within the actual town appear to be abandoned.

Toponymy
An early variant name was Millburn. The present name was suggested on account of ownership of the local mill and other enterprises frequently changing hands.

References

External links
West Virginia Division of Culture and History: Exchange

Unincorporated communities in Braxton County, West Virginia
Unincorporated communities in West Virginia